William J. Woods (January 26, 1898 – May 20, 1927) was an American baseball outfielder in the Negro leagues. He played from 1919 to 1926 with several teams.

References

External links
 and Baseball-Reference Black Baseball stats and Seamheads

1898 births
1927 deaths
Bacharach Giants players
Brooklyn Royal Giants players
Chicago American Giants players
Indianapolis ABCs players
Washington Potomacs players
Baseball outfielders
20th-century African-American sportspeople